Shillay is an uninhabited island which lies 2 km north of Pabbay in the Outer Hebrides of Scotland.

The name is derived from the Norse selr-øy meaning seal island and is a Scottish Wildlife Trust reserve owing to its international importance for breeding grey seals.

There is no record or evidence that it has ever seen human habitation.

Footnotes

Islands of the Sound of Harris
Uninhabited islands of the Outer Hebrides